The Coastal Troops are a service arm of the Russian Navy, designed to guard Russian fleets' forces, personnel, and seashore objects against exposure to enemy surface ships; to defend naval bases and other important facilities of the Fleets from the land, including against amphibious and air assaults; to be landed and act in the course of amphibious and air assaults; to support the Russian Ground Forces in the course of defence against airborne and amphibious assaults; to destroy surface ships, boats and amphibious transport means within the fire envelope.

Subordinate arms and equipment 
The Coastal Troops of the Russian Navy include three Arms:
 Coastal Defence Missile Artillery
 Motorized coastal defence troops
 Naval Infantry

Each Arm achieves certain objectives on its own and in conjunction with the other Arms of the Coastal Troops and Forces of the Navy, as well as formations and units of the other Services and Arms of the Armed Forces.

Brigades and battalions are the main organizational elements of the Coastal Troops.

The Coastal Troops are mainly equipped with combined-arms armaments and equipment. They are armed with coastal missile systems (CMSs) of anti-ship guided missiles, stationary and mobile artillery mounts, designed to destroy sea and ground targets, special (naval) reconnaissance means, etc.

List of units

Pacific Fleet 
Chief of the Coastal Forces - Major General Pushkin, Sergey Vitalyevich

72nd Coastal Missile Brigade (Smolyaninovo, Primorsky Krai).
216th Electronic Warfare Regiment (Petropavlovsk-Kamchatsky, Kamchatka Krai)
155th Naval Infantry Brigade (Vladivostok, Primorsky Krai)
Brigade HQ: Reconnaissance Battalion, Engineer Battalion, Logistics Battalion, Signal Company, Amphibious Company, Anti-tank Company, Nuclear, Biological and Chemical Protection Squad
59th Naval Infantry Battalion
47th Air-Assault Battalion
Tank Battalion
287th Artillery Divizion
288th Air Defence Divizion
40th Naval Infantry Brigade (Petropavlovsk-Kamchatsky, Kamchatsky Krai)
Brigade HQ: Reconnaissance Battalion, Engineer Battalion, Logistics Battalion, Signal Company, Amphibious Company, Anti-tank Company, MLRS Divizion, Nuclear, Biological and Chemical Protection Squad
Naval Infantry Battalion
Air-Assault Battalion
Tank Company
Artillery Divizion
Air Defence Divizion
Rifles Company
520th Coastal Missile-Artillery Brigade (Sakhalin Island, Sakhalin Oblast)
1036th Coastal Missile-Artillery Divizion (Sakhalin Island, Sakhalin Oblast)
830th Coastal Missile-Artillery Divizion (Sakhalin Island, Sakhalin Oblast)
412nd Coastal Missile-Artillery Divizion (Sakhalin Island, Sakhalin Oblast)
574th Coastal Missile-Artillery Divizion (Iturup Island, Sakhalin Oblast)
789th Coastal Missile-Artillery Divizion (Simushir Island, Sakhalin Oblast)
Kunashir Island Coastal Missile-Artillery Divizion (Kunashir Island, Sakhalin Oblast)
Matua Island Coastal Missile-Artillery Divizion (Matua Island, Sakhalin Oblast)
97th Coastal Artillery Divizion (Iturup Island, Sakhalin Oblast)
140th Communications Center (Vladivostok, Primorsky Krai)
471st Electronic Warfare Center (Petropavlovsk-Kamchatsky, Kamchatsky Krai)
474th Electronic Warfare Center (Shtykovo, Primorsky Krai)
1532nd Anti-Aircraft Missile Regiment (Petropavlovsk-Kamchatsky, Kamchatsky Krai). Since April 2015, the regiment is armed with S-400 air defence system.

Black Sea Fleet 

Chief of the Coastal Forces - Major General Denis Lyamin

22nd Army Corps
127th Reconnaissance Brigade (Nakhimov district, City of Sevastopol)
Brigade HQ: Signal Battalion, Logistics and Support Company, Engineer Company, EW Company, Military Police Company, Chemical Protection Group, Medical Unit
Reconnaissance Battalion
ELINT Battalion
Psychological Warfare Company
UAV Company
126th Guards Coastal Defence Brigade (Perevalnoe, Republic of Crimea). Since 2019, the brigade is armed with  Tornado-G MLRS.
Brigade HQ: Reconnaissance Battalion, Engineer Battalion, Logistics Battalion, Signal Battalion, EW Company, Air Defence Company, Sniper Company, Chemical Protection Company, Medical Company, Howitzer Divizion, MLRS Divizion
1st Motorized Battalion 
2nd Motorized Battalion
Mountain Infantry Battalion
Tank Battalion
8th Coastal Artillery Regiment (Simferopol, Republic of Crimea). Since 2019, the regiment is armed with Tornado-G MLRS.
810th Separate Guards Naval Infantry Brigade (Gagarinsky district, Сity of Sevastopol)
Brigade HQ: Reconnaissance Battalion, Engineer Battalion, Logistics Battalion, Signal Company, Amphibious Company, Anti-tank Company, Flamethrower Company, Artillery Divizion
557th Naval Infantry Battalion 
542nd Air-Assault Battalion
547th Air-Defence Artillery Divizion
538th Logistics and Support Battalion
382th Separate Naval Infantry Battalion (Temryuk, Krasnodar Krai)
388th Separate Marine Reconnaissance Unit (Nakhimov district, City of Sevastopol)
11th Separate Coastal Missile-Artillery Brigade (Anapa, Krasnodar Krai)
Brigade HQ: Engineer Battalion, Logistics and Support Company, Signal Company
25th Coastal Missile-Artillery Divizion
459th Coastal Missile-Artillery Divizion
Technical Support Divizion
15th Coastal Missile-Artillery Brigade (Lenin district, City of Sevastopol)
Brigade HQ: Engineer Company, Logistics and Support Company, Signal Company, Air Defence Divizion
Coastal Missile-Artillery Divizion
Coastal Missile-Artillery Divizion
Utyos Divizion
854th Coastal Missile Regiment (Khersones AFB, City of Sevastopol)
475th Electronic Warfare Center (Balaklava District, City of Sevastopol)
1096th Anti-Air Missile Regiment (Nakhimov district, City of Sevastopol)
68th Naval Engineer Regiment (Evpatoria, Republic of Crimea)
4th Nuclear, Biological and Chemical Protection Troops Regiment (Nakhimov district, City of Sevastopol)
133th Logistics and Support Brigade (Bakhchisarai, Republic of Crimea)
1127th Artillery Repair Unit (Nakhimov district, City of Sevastopol)

Baltic Fleet 
Head of the coastal troops - Lieutenant-General Andrei Guschin
The creation of the 11th Army Corps allows for a quick increase in the grouping of troops in Kaliningrad.

11th Army Corps
 18th Guards Motor Rifle Division (Gusev, Kaliningrad Oblast)
Division HQ
79th Motor Rifle Regiment
275th Motor Rifle Regiment
280th Motor Rifle Regiment
11th Tank Regiment
20th Reconnaissance Battalion
26th Automobile Battalion
Signal Battalion
Engineer Battalion
152nd Guards Missile Brigade (Chernyakhovsk, Kaliningrad Oblast)
244th Artillery Brigade (Kaliningrad, Kaliningrad Oblast)
7th Guards Motor Rifle Regiment (Kaliningrad, Kaliningrad Oblast)
22nd Air Defence Missile Regiment (Kaliningrad, Kaliningrad Oblast)
46th Separate Reconnaissance Battalion (Gusev, Kaliningrad Oblast)
40th Separate Signal Battalion (Gusev, Kaliningrad Oblast)
44th Air Defence Division (Gvardeysk, Kaliningrad Oblast)
Division HQ
183rd Air Defence Missile Regiment
1543rd Air Defence Missile Regiment
81st Radio-Technical Regiment
336th Guards Naval Infantry Brigade (Baltiysk, Kaliningrad Oblast)
Brigade HQ: Sniper Company, Airborne Company, Signal Company, Anti-tank Missile Divizion, Flamethrower Company, Engineer Company, Logistics and Support Company, Medical Company, Military Police Squad
877th Naval Infantry Battalion
879th Air Assault Battalion 
884th Naval Infantry Battalion
724th Reconnaissance Battalion 
1612th Self-Propelled Artillery Divizion
1592nd Self-Propelled Artillery Divizion
1618th Air Defence Missile Divizion
25th Coastal Missile Brigade (Donskoe, Kaliningrad Oblast) 
69th Naval Engineer Regiment (Gvardeysk, Kaliningrad Oblast)
302nd Electronic Warfare Regiment (Gvardeysk, Kaliningrad Oblast)
313th PDSS Detachment (Baltiysk, Kaliningrad Oblast)
473th PDSS Detachment (Kronstadt, City of Saint Petersburg)
319th Military Police Battalion (Chernyakhovsk, Kaliningrad Oblast)
1488th Separate Automobile Battalion (Kaliningrad, Kaliningrad Oblast)
561st Naval Reconnaissance Detachment (Parusnoye, Kaliningrad Oblast)
841st Electronic Warfare Center (Yantarny, Kaliningrad Oblast)
742nd Communications Center (Kaliningrad, Kaliningrad Oblast)

Northern Fleet 
Chief of the Coastal Forces Lieutenant general Dmitry Kraev

14th Army Corps
Corps HQ
80th Arctic Motor Rifle Brigade (Alakurtti, Murmansk Oblast). Trained for combat operations in the Arctic region and protecting interests of Russia on the continental shelf.
Brigade HQ: Signal Battalion, Logistics and Support Company, Engineer Company,  UAV Company, Military Police Company, Chemical Protection Group, Medical Company
1st Motorized Battalion
2nd Motorized Battalion
Reconnaissance Battalion
200th Motorized Rifle Brigade (Arctic) (Pechenga, Murmansk Oblast)
Brigade HQ: Signal Battalion, Logistics and Support Company, UAV Company, Military Police Company, EW Company, Courrier Detachment 
583rd Motorized Battalion
658th Motorized Battalion
664th Motorized Battalion
60th Guards Tank Battalion
274th Guards Engineers Battalion
416th Artillery Divizion
471st Howitzer Divizion
382nd MLRS Divizion
871st Anti-tank Divizion
226th Missile Air Defence Divizion
246th Air Defence Divizion
58th Signal Battalion (Murmansk, Murmansk Oblast)
61st Separate Naval Infantry Brigade (Sputnik, Murmansk Oblast):
Brigade HQ: Signal Company, Logistics and Support Company, Rifle Company
874th Naval Infantry Battalion
876th Air Assault Battalion
317th Naval Infantry Battalion
318th Naval Infantry Battalion
886th Reconnaissance Battalion
1591st Self-Propelled Artillery Divizion. Armed with Nona-SVK
1611th Self-Propelled Artillery Divizion. Armed with Gvozdika
1617th Anti-Air missile Artillery Divizion. Armed with 2K22Tunguska
180th Naval Engineer Battalion 
75th Naval Infirmary. It is the main hospital of the Northern Fleet, consisting of a mobile detachment of medical workers for operations in the combat formations of the landing force.
536th Guards Coastal Missile-Artillery Brigade (Snezhnogorsk, Murmansk Oblast)
Brigade HQ: Engineer Company, Logistics and Support Company, Signal Company, Air Defence Divizion
Coastal Missile-Artillery Divizion
Coastal Missile-Artillery Divizion
63rd Naval Engineer Regiment (Severomorsk, Murmansk Oblast)
99th Tactical Arctic Detachment (Kotelny Island, Sakha Republic)
71st Tactical Arctic Detachment (Franz Josef Land, Arkhangelsk Oblast)
160th PDSS Detachment (Vidyaevo, Murmansk Oblast)
269th PDSS Detachment (Gadzhiyevo, Murmansk Oblast)
313rd PDSS Detachment (Sputnik, Murmansk Oblast)
741st Communications Center (Severomorsk, Murmansk Oblast)
186th Electronic Warfare Center (Severomorsk, Murmansk Oblast)
211th Naval Infantry Security Battalion (Olenegorsk, Murmansk Oblast)
58th Separate Security Company (Gadzhiyevo, Murmansk Oblast)

Caspian Flotilla 

177th Naval Infantry Regiment (Kaspiysk, Republic of Dagestan) (in service with the BTR-82, BTR-80, MT-LB) 
414th Guards Naval Infantry Battalion (Kaspiysk, Republic of Dagestan)
727th Naval Infantry Battalion (Astrakhan, Astrakhan Oblast) 
46th Coastal Missile Divizion (Kaspiysk, Republic of Dagestan)
847th Coastal Missile Divizion (Kaspiysk, Republic of Dagestan)

References

External links

 

Coastal fortifications
Military units and formations established in 1992